This Campeonato Carioca was the 109th edition of football of FFERJ (Federação de Futebol do Estado do Rio de Janeiro, or Rio de Janeiro State Football Federation). It started play on January 24, 2009 and ended on May 3, 2009. Sixteen teams contested this edition.

América and Cardoso Moreira, relegated the previous year, were replaced by Bangu and Tigres, respectively winners and runners-up of the lower level championship in 2008.

Teams

System
The 16 clubs were divided into two groups.

Group A: Americano, Cabofriense, Duque de Caxias, Fluminense, Madureira, Resende, Tigres and Vasco;
Group B: Bangu, Boavista, Botafogo, Flamengo, Friburguense, Macaé, Mesquita and Volta Redonda.

The tournament was divided in two stages:
 Taça Guanabara: teams from each group played in single round-robin format against the others in their group. The two top placed teams in each group advanced to semifinal and then, to the final, played in one single match at Maracanã Stadium. Botafogo won the title, defeating surprising Resende in the final.
 Taça Rio: teams from one group play against teams from the other group once. Top two teams in each group qualify to semifinal and final, to be played in one single match at Maracanã Stadium.  Botafogo reached this final as well, however they were unable to clinch the title as Flamengo won 1-0 to force a championship aggregate to decide the state title.
 Finals: Taça Guanabara and Taça Rio winners play twice at Maracanã Stadium. If the same club wins both stages, it will be declared champions and the final will not be necessary. Botafogo and Flamengo played the finals, with Flamengo winning the title on penalties.

Championship

Taça Guanabara

Group A

Group B

Taça Moisés Mathias de Andrade

Semifinals

Finals

Semifinals

Finals

Taça Rio

Group A

Group B

Taça João Ellis Filho

Semifinals

Finals

Semifinals

Finals

Championship finals

Aggregate table

Campeonato Carioca seasons
Carioca